Mohamed Hesham El-Bassiouny ( Mody ) (born 10 May 1990) is an Egyptian handball player for Zamalek SC (handball) and the Egyptian national team.

References

1990 births
Living people
Egyptian male handball players
Handball players at the 2016 Summer Olympics
Olympic handball players of Egypt
Competitors at the 2013 Mediterranean Games
Mediterranean Games gold medalists for Egypt
Mediterranean Games medalists in handball
21st-century Egyptian people